Lovers is a 2014 Indian Telugu-language romantic comedy film directed by Harinath and starring Sumanth Ashwin and Nanditha. The film was a box office success.

Cast 
Sumanth Ashwin as Siddhu 
Nanditha as Chitra Subramanyam
Tejaswini as Geetha
Varshini Sounderajan as Soumya
Saptagiri as Suresh
Chandini
M. S. Narayana
Sai Kumar Pampana
Duvvasi Mohan
Anitha Chowdary

Soundtrack 
The music is composed by J. B.

Reception 
A critic from Deccan Chronicle wrote that "The film is worth a watch just for Saptagiri’s histrionics". A critic from The Times of India opined that "The story isnt as striking as the performances. Watch it for Saptagiri's comedy". A critic from Idlebrain.com wrote that "Plus points are spicy dialogues and entertainment provided by Saptagiri and Sai Kumar Pampana. A better handling of romance/emotions coupled with an arresting screenplay in second half is needed for an impressive output". A critic from 123Telugu said that "On the whole, Lovers clicks only because of the entertaining second half, and Sapathagiri’s hilarious comedy".

References 

2010s Telugu-language films
Indian romantic comedy films